Vandœuvre may refer to:
 Vandœuvre-lès-Nancy, Meurthe-et-Moselle, France
 Vandœuvres, Switzerland

See also 
 Vendeuvre (disambiguation)
 Vendœuvres, Indre, France